Physonota is a genus of tortoise beetles and hispines in the family Chrysomelidae. There are more than 40 described species in Physonota.

Species
These 41 species belong to the genus Physonota:

 Physonota alutacea Boheman, 1854 (wild olive tortoise beetle)
 Physonota arizonae Schaeffer, 1925 (Arizona tortoise beetle)
 Physonota attenuata Boheman, 1854
 Physonota breviuscula Boheman, 1856
 Physonota calcarata (Boheman, 1854)
 Physonota caudata Boheman, 1854
 Physonota cerea Boheman, 1854
 Physonota citrina Boheman, 1854
 Physonota citrinella Boheman, 1854
 Physonota convexa Borowiec, 1995
 Physonota dilatata Kirsch, 1876
 Physonota disjuncta (Chevrolat, 1834)
 Physonota eucalypta Boheman, 1862
 Physonota flavago Boheman, 1854
 Physonota gigantea Boheman, 1854
 Physonota helianthi (Randall, 1838) (sunflower tortoise beetle)
 Physonota humilis Boheman, 1856
 Physonota incrustata Boheman, 1854
 Physonota limoniata Boheman, 1862
 Physonota lutarella Boheman, 1856
 Physonota maculiventris Boheman, 1854
 Physonota mexicana Boheman, 1854
 Physonota nitidicollis Boheman, 1854
 Physonota ovalis Boheman, 1854
 Physonota ovipennis Champion, 1894
 Physonota pacifica Spaeth, 1932
 Physonota pellucida Wagener, 1877
 Physonota perampla Champion, 1894
 Physonota picticollis Boheman, 1854
 Physonota plana Boheman, 1854
 Physonota puncticollis Borowiec, 1995
 Physonota quinquepunctata Walsh & Riley
 Physonota separata Boheman, 1854
 Physonota stigmatilis Boheman, 1854
 Physonota sublaevigata Spaeth, 1915
 Physonota translucida Boheman, 1854
 Physonota turgida Boheman, 1854
 Physonota unipunctata (Say, 1824) (horsemint tortoise beetle)
 Physonota vitticollis Boheman, 1854
 Physonota vittifera Spaeth, 1915

References

Further reading

External links

 

Cassidinae
Articles created by Qbugbot